Segamat is a district in the Malaysian state of Johor.

Segamat may also refer to:

, coaster ship formerly named Empire Seaview
Segamat (federal constituency), federal constituency in the Segamat district
Segamat (town), town in the Segamat district

See also 
Segama, state constituency in Sabah, Malaysia